This article shows the players that have played in the New South Wales State of Origin team in the history of the Rugby League State of Origin series.

1980 Game

1981 Game

1982 Series

1983 Series

1984 Series

1985 Series

1986 Series

1987 Series

1988 Series

1989 Series

1990 Series

1991 Series

1992 Series

1993 Series

1994 Series

1995 Series

1996 Series

1997 Series

1998 Series

1999 Series

2000 Series

2001 Series

2002 Series

2003 Series

2004 Series

2005 Series

2006 Series

2007 Series

2008 Series

2009 Series

2010 Series

2011 Series

2012 Series

* Michael Jennings became the first selected player not to be playing First Grade since 1982 when Phil Duke was selected from the Moree Boomerangs in northern NSW after playing for Country Origin.

2013 Series

1 - Blake Ferguson was originally selected to play in game two but was withdrawn after being suspended by the NRL. He was replaced by Nathan Merritt.
2 - Jarryd Hayne was originally selected to play in game three but withdrew due to injury. He was replaced by James McManus.
3 - Paul Gallen  was originally selected to play in game three but withdrew due to injury. He was replaced by Aaron Woods as prop, and Robbie Farah as captain. 
4 - Kurt Gidley  was originally selected to play in game one but withdrew due to injury. He was replaced by Josh Reynolds.
5 - Josh Reynolds  was originally selected to play in game three but under consultation with coach Laurie Daley was dropped to 18th Man. He was replaced by Boyd Cordner

2014 Series

2015 series

1 - Gallen retained the captaincy role from Farah in Game II.

2 - Robbie Farah was originally chosen to play in Game lll but withdrew due to a hand injury, he was replaced by Michael Ennis.

2016 series

1 - Josh Dugan was originally selected to play in Game I, but he withdrew due to an elbow injury. He was replaced by Josh Morris.
2 - James Tamou was originally selected to start on the bench in Game I, but however on game day he swapped positions with Greg Bird. Bird was moved from lock to bench, Tamou moved from bench to prop and Paul Gallen from prop to lock.
3 - Wade Graham was originally selected to play in Game II, but he was suspended. He was replaced by Tyson Frizell.
4 - Josh Morris was originally selected to play in Game II, but was forced out due to injury. Dylan Walker was moved from the bench to centre, while Jack Bird was promoted from 19th man to the bench.
5 - Adam Reynolds was originally selected to play halfback in Game III, but withdrew due to injury. James Maloney shifted from five-eighth to halfback and Matt Moylan, who had originally been dropped from the squad for James Tedesco, was recalled into the squad to start at five-eighth.

2017 Series

Notes
 Peter Wallace was originally going to be selected to play hooker but was ruled out for the entire series with a groin injury.  Titan Nathan Peats played instead.

2018 Series

2019 Series 

1 – Nathan Cleary was originally selected in the squad for game three, but was forced to withdraw due to injury. He was replaced by Mitchell Pearce.

2 – Tariq Sims was originally selected in the squad for game three, but was forced to withdraw due to suspension. He was replaced by David Klemmer.

2020 Series

2021 Series

2022 Series 

1 – Jordan McLean was originally selected in the squad for game three, but was forced to withdraw due to injury. He was replaced by Jacob Saifiti.

Notes
a.  Only one State of Origin game was played in both 1980 and 1981.
b. Exhibition match played at Veterans Memorial Stadium in Long Beach, California, United States.
c.  Only Super League players could play in the Super League Tri-series.
d.  Timana Tahu was originally selected to play but withdrew due to personal reasons. He was replaced by Joel Monaghan
e.  Hindmarsh switched places with Waterhouse to play in the starting side after being initially selected for the bench.
f.  The 18th man is a reserve to cover for any forthcoming injuries and, unless chosen, does not actually play.
g.  Dean Young switched places with Michael Ennis to play in the starting side after being initially selected for the bench.
h.  Josh Dugan was originally selected to play but withdrew due to injury. He was replaced by Anthony Minichiello.

References

External links
"Every State of Origin rep" at couriermail.com.au

 
New South Wales rugby league team squads